Clinidium newtoni is a species of ground beetle in the subfamily Rhysodinae. It was described by Ross T. Bell & J.R. Bell in 1985. It is known from near Pueblo Nuevo Solistahuacán in Chiapas (southern Mexico) and from Francisco Morazán and Ocotepeque Departments in Honduras. The Honduran specimens were found under bark.

Clinidium newtoni is named after entomologist , the collector of the holotype.

References

Clinidium
Beetles of Central America
Beetles of North America
Fauna of Honduras
Insects of Mexico
Beetles described in 1985